Hassan Ahmad Hassan Al Diqqi (born on January 3, 1957) is an Emirati co-founder of Al Islah party in the United Arab Emirates and the leader of Emirates Al Ummah party. Al Diqqi has been described by United Arab Emirates officials as an extremist Islamist and has been linked to supporting terrorist activities and groups in Syria and elsewhere in the Middle East and North Africa through his party.

Al Diqqi was found guilty of supporting terrorist activities in Syria and attempting to overthrow the United Arab Emirates government and was sentenced to 10 years in prison and AED 10 million fine (approx. $2,700,000), however he has escaped to Syria and is currently allegedly living in Turkey.

Career
He attempted to form the party in UAE in 2012, but was prohibited by the Emirati government due to his ties with jihadist organizations. Despite this, he continued his efforts and established the party in the UAE. He became the leader of the UAE chapter of Al Ummah when the former leader and party co-founder, Mohammed al-Abduli, was killed in 2013 by a Syrian government sniper in Raqqa while fighting for the Al-Nusra Front, the Syrian Al-Qaeda affiliate and designated terrorist group by both the U.S. and the U.N. Diqqi showed his respect for the former leader as a ‘martyr’, posting a photo of the two of them together on his Twitter page.

Online publications
Diqqi has posted 24 controversial publications online. In his 2002 book, entitled, Features, he calls U.S. and Russia as the two most dangerous countries in the world and makes numerous negative ethnic and sectarian references throughout the book, including citing jihad against Christians, Jews, Alawites, and Shiites. He also discusses putting an end to UAE's touristic practices.

Conference
In 2013, The Washington Post reported of the Ummah Conference's ties to the Syrian conflict as well as Diqqi's in particular. They reported that the conference has raised millions of dollars in funds which support radical groups and recruited thousands of Muslim volunteers to fight for Syria through promoting a recruitment campaign in which they target secular Arab governments and “American Terrorism” as the enemy. Al Diqqi was seen at the Mohammed al-Abduli training camp, a military training camp in Syria established by Al Ummah and named for the party's former UAE leader, in a video posted May 2013 alongside the Saudi chapter's leader, Mohammad Saad al-Mufrih, appealing for resources to assist the Syrian Rebels.

Twitter page
Furthermore, his Twitter page, followed by over 30,000 accounts, has been the source of controversial posts and videos. In June 2013, he said that the Syrian conflict was a way to empower Muslims to challenge U.S. influence. He also uses the Ummah party's statement on his Twitter account, which aims to unite Islamists by saying that organizations such as the Muslim Brotherhood, Salafists, and al-Qaeda should collaborate with one another for the common Islamic nation. His Twitter also features specific destructive references towards the harm of Christians, Jews, and Persians.

Foundation
He is also associated with the Al-Karama Foundation, a Swiss-based organization which poses as a Human Rights Advocacy Group, but is in actuality a front for political Islamist networks. The group publicly advocated for the release of al Diqqi upon his arrest in 2008 for rape charges in Sharjah, where he was eventually released and continued his activities promoting jihadism and Islamists.  The group's leader, and also a senior official of the Ummah Party, Abdul Rahman Omeir al-Niami, is on the U.S. Department of Treasury’s sanctions list for his work as a major al- Qaeda financier in the transfer of millions of dollars in funding over the past 14 years.

Fugative
He has since become a fugitive from the UAE, and is thought to be living in Turkey.

References

Living people
1957 births
Emirati activists
Emirati politicians